The 1969–70 British Ice Hockey season featured the Northern League for teams from Scotland and the north of England. Murrayfield Racers won the Icy Smith Cup.

Northern League

Regular season

Spring Cup

Final
Glasgow Dynamos defeated the Murrayfield Racers

Icy Smith Cup

Semi finals

Final

Autumn Cup

Results

References

British
1969 in English sport
1970 in English sport
1969 in Scottish sport
1970 in Scottish sport